The 1992 New Mexico Lobos football team was an American football team that represented the University of New Mexico in the Western Athletic Conference (WAC) during the 1992 NCAA Division I-A football season.  In their first season under head coach Dennis Franchione, the Lobos compiled a 3–8 record (2–6 against WAC opponents) and were outscored by a total of 287 to 247. 

The team's statistical leaders included Stoney Case with 2,289 passing yards, Winslow Oliver with 1,063 rushing yards, Greg Oliver with 499 receiving yards, and kicker David Margolis with 55 points scored.

Schedule

Roster

References

New Mexico
New Mexico Lobos football seasons
New Mexico Lobos football